Belfast Metropolitan College, also known as Belfast Met, is a further and higher education institution in Belfast, Northern Ireland. The college offers both vocational education and academic qualifications. With over 37,000 enrolments and an annual budget in the region of £60 million, it is the largest FE college in the UK and the fourth largest post-secondary institution in the UK.

History
The college traces its origins back to the beginning of the twentieth century when the Belfast Municipal Technical Institute was established in 1906. It was in a grand building in College Square East, constructed between 1902 and 1906.

College Square East survived the Belfast blitz with students often having to hide in its air-raid shelters during the Second World War.

College Square East was known colloquially as the 'Black Man Tech'. The official name of the college was the Municipal Technical College however it was also known as 'The Tech' and the 'Black Man Tech'. It is often incorrectly perceived that the title ‘Black Man’ comes from the statue of Dr Henry Cooke which currently stands outside the building. However, interestingly, the name 'Black Man' dates back further than Dr Cooke (leader of Belfast's Evangelical Presbyterians). The original statue on the site and the first public statue in Belfast, was erected in 1855 to commemorate Fredrick Richard, Earl of Belfast (his courtesy title as heir to the 3rd Marquis of Donegall). The statue was dark bronze and some say that it was later painted black due to weathering making it look rather mottled. Soon it was known as ‘THE BLACK MAN’ and became one of Belfast's best loved rendezvous spots and noted landmarks in the City. Twenty years later the statue was removed and replaced by that of Dr Henry Cooke. It was taken to the Town Hall Victoria Street and in 1906 removed to the City Hall where it still stands inside the building. It is very common to acquire an affectionate name and in Belfast the 'Black Man' would have been perceived as a place, not a person, where people met and not after the ‘green statue’ of Dr Cooke.

Other specialist colleges were subsequently established in the city including Stanhope Street, Rupert Stanley, and the College of Business Studies in Brunswick Street. In the early 1990s, these colleges amalgamated as the Belfast Institute of Further and Higher Education which in turn merged with Castlereagh College to form the current Belfast Metropolitan College in 2007.

In September 2011, Belfast Met opened a new £44 million campus in Titanic Quarter. It was officially opened by Princess Anne on 10 November 2011. Michael D Higgins visited several months later.

Campuses
Belfast Met has three main campuses. They are Millfield Campus, Castlereagh Campus, and Titanic Quarter Campus.

Belfast Met also has several smaller centres around the city such as e3 at Springvale Campus, opened in 2012.

The city centre campuses at Brunswick Street and College Square East were sold when the Titanic Quarter campus opened in 2011. College Square East was made into student accommodation in 2016 at a cost of £16 million, but it retains its exterior appearance due to being a listed building.

Academic courses

Belfast Met offers courses from GCSE level to GNVQ and even undergraduate courses.

Millfield:

Castlereagh Campus:

Titanic Quarter Campus:

e3 Campus:

Leadership
Louise Warde Hunter, the former Deputy Secretary of the Northern Ireland Civil Service, became Principal and CEO of Belfast Met in April 2020. She replaced Marie-Thérèse McGivern who had been the Principal and Chief Executive of Belfast Met since 2009.

Awards
In April 2020, Belfast Met received the Queen's Anniversary Prize – a UK-wide award recognising excellence, innovation and public benefit in work carried out by UK colleges and universities.

Alumni
 Danny Blanchflower, footballer
 Aidan Browne, television presenter and actor
 Eamonn Holmes, TV personality
 John Irvine, newsreader
 Brian Keenan, writer
 Colin Morgan, actor
 Joseph Tomelty, actor and playwright
 Lynda Bryans, television presenter
 William Blease, Baron Blease

Notes

References

External links
Belfast Metropolitan College – official website

Further education colleges in Northern Ireland
Higher education colleges in Northern Ireland
Education in Belfast
Educational institutions established in 1991
1991 establishments in Northern Ireland
Further education colleges in the Collab Group